By-elections to the 26th Canadian Parliament were held to fill vacancies in the House of Commons of Canada between the 1963 federal election and the 1965 federal election. The Liberal Party of Canada led a minority government for the entirety of the 26th Canadian Parliament, with no change from by-elections.

Six vacant seats were filled through by-elections.

See also
List of federal by-elections in Canada

Sources
 Parliament of Canada–Elected in By-Elections 

1964 elections in Canada
26th